Unsolved Problems in Number Theory may refer to:

 Unsolved problems in mathematics in the field of number theory.
 A book with this title by Richard K. Guy published by Springer Verlag:
First edition 1981, 161 pages, 
Second edition 1994, 285 pages, 
Third edition 2004, 438 pages, 

Books with a similar title include:
 Solved and Unsolved Problems in Number Theory, by Daniel Shanks
 First edition, 1962
 Second edition, 1978
 Third edition, 1985, 
 Fourth edition, 1993
 Old and New Unsolved Problems in Plane Geometry and Number Theory, by Victor Klee and Stan Wagon, 1991, .